Gus Arzberger (October 29, 1921 – November 25, 2016) was a member of the Arizona State Senate. He served six terms in the Senate from January 1989 through January 2001, representing district 8. The amendment to the Arizona Constitution which limited politicians to serving four consecutive terms in either house was passed in 1992, after he had already served two terms.

References

Democratic Party Arizona state senators
1921 births
2016 deaths